Association football has been regularly included in the Pacific Games, the multi-sports event for Pacific nations, territories and dependencies, since 1963. Until 2011 the competition was known as the South Pacific Games.

Since 1971 the men's tournament has been held every four years, but was not played in 1999 due to contractual issues.  In 2007, the men's competition doubled as the Oceania Football Confederation's preliminary qualifying competition for the 2010 FIFA World Cup. The men's tournament also became the Olympic qualifier for Oceania for the 2015 edition.

The women's tournament was introduced in 2003, and has doubled up as the preliminary qualifying competition for the Olympic Games since 2007. Football was a compulsory inclusion at the Pacific Games for men's teams for many years but was made a core sport for both men's and women's teams in 2017. Football has also been held at several editions of the Pacific Mini Games, starting with the first tournament in 1981.

Pacific Games

Participating nations 
Numbers refer to the final placing of each team at the respective Games, with the host nations shown in bold. – See also the §Key to symbols within this section below the two tables.

Men's teams

Women's teams

Legend 
{| class="wikitable" style="text-align:center; margin-top:0.1em;"
|-
! colspan="4" | Key to symbols
|-
|style="background-color:#ffd700;"|1   || align=left| Gold medal for first place
|n || align=left| nth place (e.g. 5 is fifth place)  
|-
|style="background-color:#c0c0c0;"|2   || align=left| Silver medal for second place
| P    || align=left| Pool or group stage elimination
|-
|style="background-color:#cc9966;"|3   || align=left| Bronze medal for third place
| *    || align=left| Asterisk for shared placing (e.g. 5* is equal fifth)  
|-
|style="background-color:#9acdff;"|4   || align=left| Fourth place 
| # || align=left| Contested by under-23 national teams only
|-
| –    || align=left| Did not play
| †    || align=left| Withdrew before competition (did not play)
|-
| ‡    || colspan="3" align=left| Played in the tournament (FIFA qualification) but excluded from the Pacific Games placings
|}

Men's tournament

Results by year 
The table below is a summary of the finals matches in men's football at the Pacific Games since 1963:

Medalists: men's teams

Top goalscorers: men

Women's tournament

Results summary 
The table below is a summary of the finals matches in the women's football competition at the Pacific Games since 2003.

Papua New Guinea won the first four tournament finals, including against hosts New Caledonia in 2011 and as hosts against New Caledonia in 2015.

Medalists: women's teams

Top goalscorers: women

Pacific Mini Games

Men 

The table below is a summary of the medal matches played in the men's competition at the Pacific Mini Games:

Women 

, women's football has only been hosted once at the Pacific Mini Games – at Vanuatu in 2017. The table below is a summary of the medal matches played in the women's competition:

References

External links
OFC Official Website

 
Pac
Pacific Games
Pacific Games